Saigon Port is a network of ports in Ho Chi Minh City. The port name is derived from the former name of the city. By 2013, it has become the 24th busiest container port in the world.

History
Saigon Port played an important role in the foundation and development of the city of Saigon. During the era of French Indochina, the port played a significant role in the import and export of materials from the colony. 
Today, this port network is the hub for export-import of goods in south Vietnam – the economic hub of the nation, which accounts for more than two-thirds of Vietnam's economy.

Operations
In 2006, Saigon Port handled more than 35 metric tonnes of cargo and 1.5 million TEU of containers. By the end of 2012, Saigon Port now handled 3.5 million TEU of containers, an increase of 14% from 2011.

Relocation
Due to urban planning, the network of Saigon Port has been relocated to the outskirts of Ho Chi Minh City, specifically to the Hiep Phuoc New Urban and Port Area, Cat Lai New Port area and especially to Thi Vai Port and Cai Mep Port in Bà Rịa–Vũng Tàu province, 60 km South-East of Ho Chi Minh City, 30 km northwest of Vũng Tàu. The Thi Vai Port with the capacity of handling ships up to 50,000 tonnes will be the leading deep-water port of this region.

References 

Ports and harbours of Vietnam
Buildings and structures in Ho Chi Minh City
Economy of Ho Chi Minh City
Transport in Ho Chi Minh City